Agrilus fallax is a species of metallic wood-boring beetle in the family Buprestidae. It is found in North America.

References

Further reading

 
 
 

fallax
Beetles of North America
Taxa named by Thomas Say
Beetles described in 1833
Articles created by Qbugbot